Hibiscadelphus wilderianus (Maui hau kuahiwi) was a species of flowering plant in the family Malvaceae.

The plant was indigenous to ancient lava fields on the southern slopes of Mount Haleakalā, on Maui, Hawaii. Its forest habitat was devastated by  cattle ranchers, and the final tree was found dying in 1912.

Today it is believed to be extinct. In 2019 the scent of the flower was recreated using DNA sequenced from a preserved specimen.

References

External links

wilderianus
Extinct flora of Hawaii
Endemic flora of Hawaii
Biota of Maui
Plant extinctions since 1500
Taxonomy articles created by Polbot